Sarıgerme is a beach near Osmaniye Village in Ortaca district, Muğla Province, south-west Turkey. It is a holiday destination with a beach and shops.

It also has a post office (pictured) as well as a few places to drink and eat.

There are number of villages around Sarıgerme: Gökbel, Mergenli, Karadonlar, .

Sarıgerme is approximately 12 km from the airport town of Dalaman with good road access after being resurfaced several years ago.

This beach has pristine sands and it is very popular with Turkish and foreign tourists alike. The beach is long and sandy and there is usually quite a strong prevailing NW wind.

It is close to Dalyan, Dalaman and Gölbaşı

External links
sarigerme.net

Landforms of Osmaniye Province
Beaches of Turkey